Ahfad University for Women is a private women's university in Omdurman, Sudan that was founded in 1966, by Yusuf Badri, son of the Mahdist soldier Babiker Badri. The university began with only 23 students and 3 teachers. It was the first Sudanese women's college. The current president is Dr. Gasim Badri, Yusuf Badri's son.

History 
The Ahfad University for Women was founded in a familial tradition of educating girls in Sudan. After the battle of 1898 when Sudanese Mahdist forces were defeated by the Anglo-Egyptian army, Babiker Badri — a Sudanese survivor — settled in the village of Rufu'a. It was there that he opened a secular school for boys. In 1904, he asked the British authorities for permission to open an elementary school for girls — who he believed also needed to be educated. His request was denied twice, before it was finally granted by James Currie, the Director of the Educational Department of the British administration in Sudan. In 1907, Babiker Badri opened his secular school for girls in a mud hut with nine of his own daughters along with eight neighborhood girls.  

The Badri family carried on this tradition of private education for three generations in Sudan. Babiker's son Yusuf established Ahfad University in 1966, and it started with only 23 students and three faculty members, including Yusuf.  

The university was granted full university status in 1995 by the Sudan National Council for Higher Education, due to its expansion of curriculum and student body. It is the oldest and largest private university in Sudan to date.

In a 2018 interview, British-Sudanese journalist Zeinab Badawi talked about her great-grandfather Babiker Badri:

Schools 
The university has the following undergraduate schools:
 School of Management Studies (formerly School of Organizational Management)
 School of Health Sciences
 School of Psychology and Pre-School Education
 School of Rural Extension Education and Development
 School of Medicine
 School of Pharmacy.

It offers graduate programs in:
 Human Nutrition
 Gender and Development
 Gender and Peace Studies
 Sustainable Rural Development
 Business Administration
 Microfinance
 Counseling and Heath Psychology
 High Diploma in Teaching of English as a Foreign Language
 High Diploma in Teaching of Family Sciences

AUW's medium of instruction is English.

See also 
 Education in Sudan
 List of current and historical women's universities and colleges
 List of universities in Sudan

References

Further reading 
 Marie Grace Brown (2013) Sudan. Natana J. DeLong-Bas (ed.) The Oxford Encyclopedia of Islam and Women. Oxford University Press. ISBN 9780199764464
 Enrico Ille (2016) Political, financial and moral aspects of Sudan’s private higher education. Rethinking private higher education. Ethnographic perspectives, edited by Daniele Cantini. Leiden: Brill, 98-130

Educational institutions established in 1966
Universities and colleges in Sudan
Women's universities and colleges
Omdurman
1966 establishments in Sudan
Women in Sudan
Women's rights in Sudan